Ngoma is a district (akarere) in Eastern Province, Rwanda. Its capital is Kibungo.

Sectors 
Ngoma district is divided into 14 sectors
(imirenge): Gashanda, Jarama, Karembo, Kazo, Kibungo, Mugesera, Murama, Mutenderi, Remera, Rukira, Rukumberi, Rurenge, Sake and Zaza.

External links 

 
 Ngoma District government website

Eastern Province, Rwanda
Districts of Rwanda